Bozzo is an Italian surname. Notable people with this surname include:

 Briggitte Bozzo (born 2001), Venezuelan actress
 Elisa Bozzo (born 1987), Italian synchronised swimmer
 Gianni Baget Bozzo (1925–2009), Italian Catholic priest and politician
 Grazia Bozzo (born 1936), Italian gymnast
 Laura Bozzo (born 1951), Peruvian talk show hostess
 Luisa Angela Bozzo, real name of Luisella Boni, Italian actress
 Sam Bozzo (born 1969), American film director and author
 Virginia Reginato Bozzo (born 1939), Chilean politician